Frank Santopadre is an American Emmy-winning comedy writer and producer for television, radio, and live events, currently working as a staff writer on ABC's The View. From 2014 until 2022, he served as the co-producer and co-host of Gilbert Gottfried's Amazing Colossal Podcast.

Career
Santopadre has provided comedy material for TV series and specials for over 30 years, including The 15th Annual Kennedy Center Mark Twain American Prize for Humor, Ellen DeGeneres, Lewis Black & Friends: Let Freedom Laugh, The Joy Behar Show, and The Comedy Central Roast of  Pamela Anderson and Roseanne Barr.

Podcast
From 2014 to 2022, Santopadre has been the co-producer and co-host of the weekly podcast Gilbert Gottfried's Amazing Colossal Podcast, as well as an offshoot Gilbert & Frank's Amazing Colossal Obsessions. The show, co-hosted by Gilbert Gottfried, featured hour-long interviews with show business icons, including Alan Arkin, Dick Van Dyke, Bruce Dern, and Carl Reiner. It was also named Best Podcast of 2015 by the Village Voice.

References

External links
 Gilbert Gottfried's Amazing Colossal Podcast!
 Official website
 Frank Santopadre on Twitter
 
 Frank Santopadre at Vanity Fair

Living people
American television producers
American podcasters
American male writers
Year of birth missing (living people)